The AAA Hall of Fame is a hall of fame which honors professional wrestlers and wrestling personalities, established and maintained by the Mexico based national wrestling promotion Lucha Libre AAA Worldwide (AAA).

Inductees

Individuals

See also
List of professional wrestling halls of fame

References

2007 establishments in Mexico
Awards established in 2007
Professional wrestling-related lists
Professional wrestling halls of fame
Halls of fame in Mexico